The Lipman–Wolfe and Company Building is a building located in downtown Portland, Oregon, listed on the National Register of Historic Places.  It was originally the flagship store of the Lipman-Wolfe & Company department store.  The architects were Doyle & Patterson.

In the mid-1990s, the building was renovated and converted into a hotel, the Fifth Avenue Suites.  The hotel was renamed the Hotel Monaco in 2007.

See also
 National Register of Historic Places listings in Southwest Portland, Oregon

References

External links
 

1912 establishments in Oregon
A. E. Doyle buildings
Chicago school architecture in Oregon
Commercial buildings completed in 1912
Commercial buildings on the National Register of Historic Places in Oregon
Commercial Style architecture in the United States
Department stores on the National Register of Historic Places
National Register of Historic Places in Portland, Oregon
Southwest Portland, Oregon
Portland Historic Landmarks